This is a list of listed buildings in Furesø Municipality, Denmark.

The list

References

External links

 Danish Agency of Culture

 
Furesø